Among some Alaska Natives, the i'noGo tied ("house of spirits") refers to a luck and protection amulet made from blubber encased in seal fur.

References

Alaska Native culture
Amulets
Inuit mythology
Superstitions of the United States